Pseudoliva is a genus of sea snails, marine gastropod mollusks in the family Pseudolividae. 

Pseudoliva is the type genus of that family.

Species
Species within the genus Pseudoliva include:
 Pseudoliva ancilla Hanley, 1860
 Pseudoliva crassa (Gmelin, 1791) 
 † Pseudoliva dudariensis (Strausz, 1966)
 Pseudoliva sepimentum (Rang, 1832)
Synonyms
 † Pseudoliva antiqua Vincent, 1878: synonym of † Fusulculus antiquus (Vincent, 1878) (original combination)
 † Pseudoliva chavani Glibert, 1973: synonym of † Fusulculus multinodulosus (Vermeij, 1998) (invalid: junior homonym of Pseudoliva chavani Tessier, 1952; Sulcobuccinum multinodulosum is a replacement name)
 Pseudoliva kellettii A. Adams, 1855: synonym of Macron aethiops (Reeve, 1847)
 † Pseudoliva koeneni Ravn, 1939: synonym of † Fusulculus koeneni (Ravn, 1939) (original combination)
 Pseudoliva livida A. Adams, 1855: synonym of Macron lividus (A. Adams, 1855)
 † Pseudoliva monilis Olsson, 1928: synonym of † Sulcoliva monilis (Olsson, 1928) (original combination)
 Pseudoliva plumbea Chemnitz: synonym of Pseudoliva crassa (Gmelin, 1791) 
 † Pseudoliva pusilla von Koenen, 1885: synonym of † Fusulculus koeneni (Ravn, 1939) (invalid: secondary junior homonym of Fusulculus pusillus)
 † Pseudoliva rosenkrantzi Traub, 1979: synonym of † Fusulculus rosenkrantzi (Traub, 1979) (original combination)
 Pseudoliva stereoglypta G. B. Sowerby III, 1882: synonym of Macron wrightii H. Adams, 1865
 Pseudoliva striatula A. Adams, 1855: synonym of Pseudoliva crassa (Gmelin, 1791)
 Pseudoliva zebrina Adams, 1855: synonym of Luizia zebrina (A. Adams, 1855)

References

 Gofas, S., Afonso, J.P. & Brandào, M. (1985). Conchas e Moluscos de Angola = Coquillages et Mollusques d'Angola. [Shells and molluscs of Angola]. Universidade Agostinho / Elf Aquitaine Angola: Angola. 140 pp. Printed without date.

External links
 Swainson, W. (1840). A treatise on malacology or shells and shell-fish. London, Longman. viii + 419 pp
  Vermeij G. (1998). Generic revision of the neogastropod family Pseudolividae. The Nautilus 111(2): 53-84,

Pseudolividae